The human embryonic haemoglobins were discovered in 1961. These include Hb-Gower 1, consisting of 2 zeta chains and 2 epsilon chains, and Hb-Gower 2, which consists of 2 αlpha-chains and 2 epsilon-chains, the zeta and epsilon chains being the embryonic haemoglobin chains.

Embryonic hemoglobin is a tetramer produced in the blood islands in the embryonic yolk sac during the mesoblastic stage (from 3rd week of pregnancy until 3 months). The protein is commonly referred to as hemoglobin ε.

Chromosomal abnormalities can lead to a delay in switching from embryonic hemoglobin.

Hemoglobin Gower 1

Hemoglobin Gower 1 (also referred to as ζ2ε2 or HbE Gower-1) is a form of hemoglobin existing only during embryonic life, and is the primary embryonic hemoglobin.  It is composed of two zeta chains and two epsilon chains, and is relatively unstable, breaking down easily.

Hemoglobin Gower 2

Hemoglobin Gower 2 (also referred to as α2ε2 or HbE Gower-2) is a form of hemoglobin existing at low levels during embryonic and fetal life.  It is composed of two alpha chains and two epsilon chains, and is somewhat unstable, though not as much as hemoglobin Gower 1.  Due to its relative stability compared to hemoglobin Gower 1 and hemoglobin S, it has been proposed as a subject for reactivation in the adult in cases of severe β thalassemia and hemoglobinopathies in subjects for which the reactivation of hemoglobin F is contraindicated due to toxicity concerns.

Hemoglobin Portland I

Hemoglobin Portland I (also referred to as ζ2γ2 or HbE Portland-1) is a form of hemoglobin existing at low levels during embryonic and fetal life, composed of two zeta chains and two gamma chains.

Hemoglobin Portland II

Hemoglobin Portland II (also referred to as ζ2β2 or HbE Portland-2) is a form of hemoglobin existing at low levels during embryonic and fetal life, composed of two zeta chains and two beta chains.  It is quite unstable, more so than even hemoglobin Gower 1, and breaks down very rapidly under stress.  Despite this, it has been proposed as a candidate for reactivation in cases of severe α thalassemia or hemoglobinopathies afflicting the alpha chain.

Table

References

Hemoglobins